Sáric Municipality is a municipality in Sonora in north-western Mexico. Its northern boundary is the U.S. state of Arizona. The population of the municipality (urban and rural areas) was 2,703 in 2010 living in an area of 1,676.23 square kilometers. The elevation is around 800 meters. At the municipal seat it is 780 meters.

Boundaries are with Pima County and Santa Cruz County in the U.S. state of Arizona to the north; Nogales, Sonora, to the east; Tubutama to the south; Altar to the west; and Magdalena de Kino to the southeast.   

The only settlements of over 100 population were Sáric (892) , El Sásabe (1,295) , and Cierro Prieto (353) , as enumerated in the 2010 census.
There is an international border crossing leading to Sasabe, Arizona.  

The land is high desert with extreme temperatures in the summer months.  The Altar River has its source north of the municipality in the Arizona mountains and flows south.  

The desert lands are poor and agriculture can only be practiced in the Altar River valley where wheat, corn, alfalfa, sorghum, and rye grass are grown.  Extensive cattle raising is carried out.

The Spanish name of the town derives from the O'odham name, Ṣaʼalk, which means "mountain pass".

References
 2010 census tables: INEGI

External links
Sáric, Ayuntamiento Digital (Official Website of Sáric, Sonora)

Municipalities of Sonora